Kekulene is a polycyclic aromatic hydrocarbon which consists of 12 fused benzene rings arranged in a circle.  It is therefore classified as a [12]-circulene with the chemical formula C48H24. It was first synthesized in 1978, and was named in honor of August Kekulé, the discoverer of the structure of the benzene molecule.

Geometry and electronic structure 
The nature of the π bonding within the molecule was long debated, as several distinctly different arrangements were possible. The two most significant proposals are the "Clar" configuration, consisting of six benzene-like (aromatic 6 π-electron) rings connected by bridging bonds and vinyl groups in non-aromatic rings, and the "Kekulé" configuration, consisting of two concentric aromatic rings (18 π-electron inner, 30 π-electron outer) linked by radial single bonds. 

The synthesis of the compound, first reported in 1978, allowed experimental determination of the electronic structure. In the late 1970s, 1H-NMR provided evidence of benzene rings and X-ray analysis determined that the structure had had alternating aromatic and non-aromatic rings, both consistent with the Clar configuration. In 2019, the configuration was determined to be one consisting of benzene-like rings alternating with non-aromatic linkages, by using single molecule atomic force microscopy to measure the carbon–carbon bond-lengths and bond orders. This configuration is in keeping with Clar's rule, as it has the largest number of disjoint aromatic π sextets.

Though the whole structure is essentially planar, it only has three-fold symmetry rather than six-fold. The carbon–hydrogen bonds in the center of the ring have a slight alternating tilt out of the plane to avoid steric hindrance among the hydrogen atoms.

References

Polycyclic aromatic hydrocarbons
Substances discovered in the 1970s